Central Police Hospital or CPH is a hospital located in Rajarbagh, Dhaka in Bangladesh. CPH is the largest hospital in Bangladesh Police. It was established in 1954. During IGP Benazir Ahmed's tenure this hospital has been upgraded to 500 beds and from 70 beds to 250 beds in 1997–2005. It is situated at Fakirapool More and beside Rajarbag Polce lines. DIG Saleh Mohammed Tanvir is the Director of this hospital. During the COVID-19 pandemic it plays an important role by serving thousands of Policemen.

References 

Bangladesh Police
Hospitals in Dhaka
Hospitals established in 1954